Bankimanjali Stadium, also commonly known as Naihati Stadium, is a football stadium located in a municipality of Naihati in North 24 Parganas district in the Indian state of West Bengal. Named after Bankim Chandra Chatterjee, the stadium is owned by Naihati Municipality and has a capacity of 25,000 spectators at present. The stadium has hosted games of Calcutta Football League, IFA Shield, I-League, and Durand Cup. The stadium is official ground of friendly club tournament Naihati Gold Cup.

See also 
 List of football stadiums in India

References 

Sports venues in Kolkata
Football venues in West Bengal
2019 establishments in West Bengal
Sports venues completed in 2019